Maqtu-e Vosta (also Romanized as Maqţū‘-e Vostá; also known as Maqţū‘-e Mīānī) is a village in Jarahi Rural District, in the Central District of Mahshahr County, Khuzestan Province, Iran. At the 2006 census, its population was 45, in 8 families.

References 

Populated places in Mahshahr County